Theligonum is a genus of flowering plants in the family Rubiaceae. It was described by Carl Linnaeus in 1753. The genus is found from Macaronesia to the Mediterranean Basin, and from China to temperate eastern Asia. It is the only genus in the tribe Theligoneae.

Species

 Theligonum cynocrambe L.
 Theligonum formosanum (Ohwi) Ohwi
 Theligonum japonicum Ôkubo & Makino
 Theligonum macranthum Franch.

References

External links
Theligonum in the World Checklist of Rubiaceae

Rubiaceae genera
Rubioideae